Ancistroides is a genus of skippers in the family Hesperiidae.

Species
Ancistroides armatus (Druce, 1873)
Ancistroides folus  (Cramer, [1775]) - Sri Lanka, India (South India - Saurashtra, Bombay, Ahmedabad, Madhya Pradesh, Lucknow, Calcutta, Kangara to Assam), Burma, Thailand, Indochina, China, Taiwan, Malaysia, Indonesia (Java, Bali, Lombok, Sumbawa) 
Ancistroides gemmifer (Butler, 1879)
Ancistroides longicornis Butler, 1874
Ancistroides nigrita (Latreille, [1824]) – chocolate demon
Ancistroides stellata (Oberthür, 1896) - China

References

External links

Ancistroides images at Consortium for the Barcode of Life
Natural History Museum Lepidoptera genus database

Ancistroidini
Hesperiidae genera